Resen is a large village in Veliko Tarnovo Municipality, Bulgaria, located about 20 kilometers north of the university town of Veliko Tarnovo, just south of the River Rositsa.

Resen has a few local bars, shops and a typical Bulgarian restaurant.  In summer 2007 the village centre underwent extensive improvements, including a children's play area, a supermarket, and a church.  The village is served with broadband Internet access via a wireless network from the village Post Office, and also now available is wired internet.

Several families from other countries have bought and renovated properties in the village, and a guest house called Resen Lodge has been established.

References

Villages in Veliko Tarnovo Province